Hsueh Jui-yuan is a Taiwanese physician who has served as the vice minister of Health and Welfare since August 2017 until July 18 2022. He currently serves as the Minister of Health and Welfare since July 2022.

Education
Hsueh completed his degree in medicine from Taipei Medical University in 1980. He then obtained his bachelor's and master's degree in law from National Taiwan University in 1997 and 2001 respectively.

Careers
At the Bureau of Medical Affairs of the Department of Health, he was the senior secretary in 2002–2003, deputy director-general in 2003-2004 and director-general in 2004–2008. In 2008–2015, he was the deputy superintendent of Shuang Ho Hospital of Taipei Medical University. Hsueh succeeded Chen Shih-chung as Minister of Health and Welfare on July 18 2022.

References

Living people
Year of birth missing (living people)
Taiwanese Ministers of Health and Welfare
Taiwanese hospital administrators
Taipei Medical University alumni
National Taiwan University alumni